SME may refer to:

Economics
 Small and medium-sized enterprises
 Socialist market economy, an economic system of China

Organizations

Music
 SME Limited, UK audio turntable manufacturer
 Sony Music Entertainment, US
 Spontaneous Music Ensemble, UK, mid-1960s
 Stone Music Entertainment, South Korea

Other organizations
 SME (society), formerly Society of Manufacturing Engineers
 Society for Mining, Metallurgy, and Exploration
 Sun Microelectronics, a business unit of Sun Microsystems

Science and technology

Computing
 Secure Memory Encryption, an AMD technology
 Structure mapping engine, in artificial intelligence and cognitive science
 SIGNAL Meta under Eclipse, in the SIGNAL programming language

Other uses in science and technology
 Solar Mesosphere Explorer, an Earth observation satellite
 Standard-Model Extension, in quantum field theory
 Subsequent memory effect, in cognitive psychology
 Surface-mount equipment, for electronic assembly

Other uses
 SME (newspaper), a Slovak daily
 Subject-matter expert, an authority in a particular area or topic
Lake Cumberland Regional Airport IATA code

See also

 
 
 
 same (disambiguation)
 SSME (disambiguation)